KAT8 regulatory NSL complex subunit 2 (KANSL2) also known as non-specific lethal 2 homolog (NSL2) is a protein that in humans is encoded by the KANSL2 gene.

References

Further reading